Nocardioides hankookensis is a Gram-positive, rod-shaped and non-motile bacterium from the genus Nocardioides which has been isolated from soil from Dokdo, Korea.

References

Further reading

External links
Type strain of Nocardioides hankookensis at BacDive -  the Bacterial Diversity Metadatabase	

hankookensis
Bacteria described in 2008